Dumești may refer to several places in Romania:

 Dumești, a commune in Iași County
 Dumești, a commune in Vaslui County, and its village of Dumeștii Vechi
 Dumești, a village in Sălciua Commune, Alba County
 Dumești, a village in Vorța Commune, Hunedoara County
 Dumești (river), in Hunedoara County